USWA can refer to:

 The United States Wrestling Association, a former professional wrestling promotion
 The United Steelworkers of America, a labor union.
 The United States Warehouse Act of 1916, a United States Act of Congress.